is a 1983 Japanese film directed by Shinji Sōmai.

Awards and nominations
26th Blue Ribbon Awards
 Won: Best Actor - Ken Ogata

References

External links

1983 films
Films directed by Shinji Sōmai
1980s Japanese-language films
1980s Japanese films